The 8th Parliament of Sri Lanka was a meeting of the Parliament of Sri Lanka, with the membership determined by the results of the 1977 parliamentary election held on 21 July 1977. The United National Party won a 5/6 majority to form a government under J.R. Jayewardene. Later Jayawardane introduced a new constitution to Sri Lanka and was elected the 1st President of Sri Lanka. The government extended their term to stay in power in 1983 without an election and stayed in power until 1989. The 1982 Sri Lankan national referendum took place on December 22, 1982, giving the people of Sri Lanka the option to extend the life of parliament by 6 years. It was the first and so far only national referendum to be held in Sri Lanka.[1] The referendum was called for by President J. R. Jayawardene, who had been elected to a fresh six-year term as President in October 1982. With the life of the current parliament due to expire in August 1983,

Results
The UNP won the largest landslide in Sri Lankan history (due to the first-past-the-post system). For the first time, a Tamil party won the second-highest number of seats in Parliament and became the Official Opposition.

Abeyratne Pilapitiya of the UNP was elected MP for Kalawana, but was subsequently unseated in an election petition. Sarath Muttetuwegama of the Communist Party was returned to Parliament in the ensuing by-election.

The 1977 election was the only one ever held under the 1972 constitution.

Electorate Results

Western Province

Colombo District

Gampaha District

Kalutara District

Central Province

Matale District

Kandy District

Nuwaraeliya District

Southern Province

Galle District

Matara District

Hambantota District

Northern Province

Jaffna District

Vanni District

Eastern Province

Trincomalee District

Batticalao District

Ampara District

North Western Province

Puttalam District

Kurunegala District

North Central Province

Anuradapura District

Polonnaruwa District

Uva Province

Badulla District

Monaragala District

Sabaragamuwa Province

Kegalla District

Ratnapura District 

 Source

Notes

References

Sources

 
 
 
 
 

Parliament of Sri Lanka
1977 Sri Lankan parliamentary election